"The Difference" is a song by American rock band the Wallflowers. It was released in 1997 as the third single from their second album, Bringing Down the Horse. The song spent eight weeks at number three on the Mainstream Rock Tracks chart and peaked at number five on the Modern Rock Tracks chart. It was nominated for a Grammy Award for Best Rock Song in 1998. "The Difference" also peaked at number 12 in Canada, topping the RPM Alternative 30 chart.

Track listings
US promo CD
 "The Difference" (LP version) – 3:45

Australian CD single
 "The Difference" (LP version)
 "I Wish I Felt Nothing"
 "God Don't Make Lonely Girls" (live from KFOG)

Charts

Weekly charts

Year-end charts

References

1996 songs
1997 singles
Interscope Records singles
Song recordings produced by T Bone Burnett
Songs written by Jakob Dylan
The Wallflowers songs